Lloyd Bailey Thomas "Shrimp" Andrews (November 4, 1894 – November 17, 1974) was a Canadian ice hockey left winger who played four seasons in National Hockey League for the Toronto St. Pats between 1921 and 1925. The rest of his career, which lasted from 1914 to 1934, was spent playing in senior and minor leagues.

Playing career
Andrews was born in Tillsonburg, Ontario. He played four seasons in the National Hockey League for the Toronto St. Pats from 1921–22 to 1924–25. During those four seasons, he played 53 games, scoring 8 goals and adding 5 assists for 13 points. He also had 10 penalty minutes.

Andrews' career was stopped before he could get going as he enlisted in World War I while still a teenager. He returned to play senior hockey for three years at which point the St. Pats signed him on January 23, 1922.

Almost immediately he helped his NHL team win the Stanley Cup. He scored the game-winning goal in the St. Pats 6–0 win over the Vancouver Millionaires in game four of the best-of-five 1922 Stanley Cup finals in what was to be his only trip to the playoffs.

After playing four seasons with the St. Pats, Andrews joined the Can-Am league for six years where he proved to be a scorer of some note, netting as many as 24 goals in the 1929–30 season. He then joined the CHL before retiring in 1934.

Career statistics

Regular season and playoffs

References

External links
 

1894 births
1974 deaths
Canadian ice hockey left wingers
Canadian military personnel of World War I
Ice hockey people from Ontario
New Haven Eagles players
Ontario Hockey Association Senior A League (1890–1979) players
Philadelphia Ramblers players
Sportspeople from Tillsonburg
St. Paul Greyhounds players
Stanley Cup champions
Toronto St. Pats players